Anthony "Tony" Bitetto (born July 15, 1990) is an American professional ice hockey defenceman currently playing for the Charlotte Checkers in the American Hockey League (AHL) while under contract to the Florida Panthers of the National Hockey League (NHL).

Early life
Bitetto grew up on Long Island, New York and was a New York Rangers fan throughout childhood.

Playing career
He was selected 168th overall in the 2010 NHL Entry Draft by the Predators before committing to a collegiate career with Northeastern University in the Hockey East conference.

On March 29, 2012, Bitetto was signed to a two-year entry-level contract with the Nashville Predators. He then began his professional career in the 2012 playoffs with the Predators American Hockey League affiliate, the Milwaukee Admirals.

In the 2014–15 season, his third full professional season and leading the Admirals in scoring by a defenseman, Bitetto was recalled by the Predators and made his NHL debut against the Detroit Red Wings in a 5–2 defeat on January 17, 2015. Bitetto signed a two year contract to stay with the Predators on February 26, 2016, and he scored his first career NHL goal on March 9, 2016, in a game against the Calgary Flames.

On January 9, 2018,  Bitetto re-signed with the Predators.

During the 2018–19 season, Bitetto appeared in 18 games before he was placed on waivers by the Predators and claimed by division rival Minnesota Wild the following day, on January 25, 2019.

As a free agent from the Wild, Bitetto agreed to a one-year, two-way contract in joining his third central division club, the Winnipeg Jets, on July 2, 2019. Through 51 games with the Jets in the 2019–20 season, Bitetto registered career highs with 8 assists for 8 points, plus/minus rating, and average ice time (15:10). Bitetto led the Jets in hits per game (2.84) and ranked 23rd in the NHL, as well as fifth among NHL defensemen.

On October 9, 2020, Bitetto left the Jets as a free agent, and signed to a two-year, two-way contract with the New York Rangers. Growing up a Rangers fan, he said he was "speechless" playing in his first game as a Ranger at Madison Square Garden. During a game against the Washington Capitals on February 4, 2021, Bitetto scored his first goal as a Ranger in a 4–2 win. He had gone 112 games without a goal; his last goal was on November 18, 2017.

During the 2021–22 season, the Rangers traded Bitetto to the San Jose Sharks in exchange for Nick Merkley at the NHL trade deadline on March 21, 2022.

As a free agent in the off-season, Bitetto was signed to a one-year, two-way contract, with the Florida Panthers on July 13, 2022. His signing marked a reunion with former coach Paul Maurice during his tenure with the Winnipeg Jets.

Career statistics

Awards and honors

References

External links

1990 births
Living people
American expatriate ice hockey players in Canada
American men's ice hockey defensemen
Charlotte Checkers (2010–) players
Cincinnati Cyclones (ECHL) players
Hartford Wolf Pack players
Ice hockey players from New York (state)
Indiana Ice players
Milwaukee Admirals players
Minnesota Wild players
Nashville Predators draft picks
Nashville Predators players
New York Rangers players
Northeastern Huskies men's ice hockey players
People from Island Park, New York
San Jose Barracuda players
Winnipeg Jets players